Tirpitzøya is an island in the Svalbard archipelago, one of the islands of Kong Karls Land. It has a length of about 3.3 kilometers, and is located outside the bay of Breibukta of Kongsøya. The island is named after German admiral Alfred von Tirpitz.

See also
 List of islands of Norway

References

Islands of Svalbard
Kong Karls Land